Harriet Irène Elisabeth K:son Ullberg (born Harriet Irène Elisabeth Karlsson; 12 June 1930 – 24 December 2022) was a Swedish painter.

Biography
K:son Ullberg grew up in Strängnäs, Sweden. She studied at the Valand Academy of Göteborg. In 1962 she had her first exhibition in Göteborg. Following this, most of her career took place in Sweden and in France, but also in Rome, Capri, and Greece.

K:son Ullberg died on 24 December 2022, at the age of 92.

Style
K:son Ullberg drew inspiration from Fauvism, Impressionism, Realism, and Expressionism. Her painting media include modes such as oil, watercolor, and graphic arts. A common characteristic of K:son Ullberg's art is her use of intense and vivid colors. K:son Ullberg developed a concept of art which she called Realism and Poetry.

Below are three of K:son Ullberg's paintings:

Exhibitions
K:son Ullberg held exhibitions in multiple locations in Sweden and in France, some of which include the following:
 Galerie Larock-Granoff (formerly Galerie Katia Granoff) in Paris
 Galerie André Weil, Avenue Matignon, in Paris
 Involved in collective exhibitions at the Nationalmuseum in Stockholm, including Unga tecknare, Göteborgs konstförenings Decemberutställning at Göteborgs konsthall 1956, summer exhibition at Mässhallen in Gothenburg, Stockholmssalongerna at Liljevalchs konsthall, Sörmlandssalongerna in Katrineholm, Lunds konsthall, and Grand Palais in Paris, and the Swedish Cultural Center in Paris.
 Strängnäs Cathedral, exhibition Se, jag är världens ljus 16 May to 13 June 2021.

Represented
K:son Ullberg is represented at
 Moderna Museet in Stockholm
 Gothenburg Museum
 Hälsinglands museum
 Swedish Cultural Center in Paris

 Statens konstråd
 other districts and regions in Sweden.

Awards
Some of K:son Ullberg's prizes include the following:
 2nd place, Folkrörelsernas Konstfrämjande anordnad litografipristävling, 1957

See also
 List of Swedish women artists

References

External links
 
 
 Artwork Archive profile

1930 births
2022 deaths
Swedish painters
Swedish women painters
Women painters
Impressionist painters
People from Strängnäs Municipality